Diana was a steam paddle steamer built in 1823 as a merchant vessel and purchased by the Bengal Government in 1824.  During the First Anglo-Burmese War she became the first steam-powered warship of the Honourable East India Company to see action.  She was transferred to the Burmese Government in 1826 and to back to the company for use by Singapore in 1837.

Construction
She was built by Kyds of Kidderpore, Calcutta as a 133-ton merchant vessel with two  side-lever engines manufactured by Henry Maudslay of Lambeth. She was launched on 12 July 1823 and purchased by the Bengal Government at the suggestion of Commander Frederick Marryat. She was armed with Congreve rockets.

First Anglo–Burmese War
The Honourable East India Company used her for riverine service in the First Anglo–Burmese War. In May 1824 she accompanied the 18-gun  , the 20-gun  and the 50-gun , from Port Cornwallis in the Andaman Islands to Rangoon, where she participated in an attack. Thereafter, she participated in operations against Penang on 19 September 1824.

In 1825 and 1826 she was under the command of Lieutenant George Winsor, who sailed her with the flotilla operating against the Burmese. While she was operating in the Irrawaddy River, Winsor made a map.

Burma and Singapore
The war ended on 8 March 1826 and in that year she was transferred to the Burmese Government. Although one reference says she was broken up in 1836, most assert that she was sold to Singapore.

Diana steamed to Singapore on 28 February 1836. Johnston & Co. advertised her for sale. The East India Company purchased her in March 1837 and appointed Samuel Congalton her captain. Dianas establishment consisted of her captain, two European officers and thirty Malays. In the East India Company's service Diana suppressed piracy and conducted maritime surveys. Congalton remained her captain until 1845 when he became captain of her replacement, the Hooghly. Diana appears to have been sold off and renamed Eliza Penelope.

Citations
Citations

References
India Office (1878) A catalogue of manuscript and printed reports, field books, memoirs, maps, etc., of the Indian surveys: deposited in the map room of the India Office. (W.H. Allen & co.).
 

Thayi, Aditya (Executive Producer) (2019). Ships That Shaped Us - S1E1: Resurrecting The Diana [documentary]. Channel News Asia, 22:53. Retrieved 2022-07-12.

Victorian-era naval ships of the United Kingdom
British ships built in India
Ships of the British East India Company
1823 ships